The NCAA Season 95 basketball tournaments are the 95th basketball season of the National Collegiate Athletic Association (Philippines) (NCAA). Arellano University are the season hosts. Separate seniors' and juniors' tournaments are held for male college and senior high school students, respectively.

Bamboo Mañalac and performers from Arellano University performed in the opening ceremony held at the Mall of Asia Arena on July 7, 2019.

The Letran Knights won the seniors' championship after beating three-time defending champions and erstwhile unbeaten San Beda Red Lions in the Finals. Finishing the elimination round undefeated, the Red Lions advanced to the Finals outright. Letran defeated San Sebastian in the first round of the stepladder semifinals to meet previous year's finalist Lyceum in the second round. The Knights defeated the Pirates to arrange a Finals meeting with the Red Lions. The Finals went the distance, with all three games being decided in the final play of the game. Letran won the title to bring the 18th championship back to Intramuros.

The San Beda Red Cubs won the juniors' title after beating the Lyceum Junior Pirates in the Finals. Both Red Cubs and Junior Pirates finished in the top two seeds after the elimination round. San Beda eliminated the LSGH Greenies, which qualified by defeating the Arellano Braves in a playoff, in the first game to advance to the Finals. Lyceum needed their twice-to-beat advantage to eliminate the San Sebastian Staglets. The Red Cubs handily defeated the Junior Pirates in Game 1, but Lyceum eked out a Game 2 win to force a third game, where San Beda won comprehensively.

Format 
The association is using this format for 2019:
 In the seniors and juniors' tournament, ten (10) teams will play in a double round-robin classification. The top four (4) team advance to the playoffs.
 Once teams are tied, tie-breaker games shall be held for the top four seeds, if necessary.
 The scenarios after the elimination round ends are the following:
If no team doesn't win all elimination round games, the regular playoffs (Final Four) shall be used.
If a team wins all elimination round games, that team will gain an automatic bye to the finals and the stepladder playoffs shall be used.
In the semifinals, the first and second seed shall earn a twice-to-beat bonus against their respective opponents. These teams shall only need to win once to advance to the finals; while the third and fourth seed teams will need to win twice to advance to the finals.
In the stepladder semifinals, the third and fourth seed will play to determine which among them will face the second seed, The winner of the game against the second seed will meet the first seed in the finals.
The finals is a best-of-three championship series.

Teams 
All ten schools are participating.

Coaches

Coaching changes

Venues

Like most Metro Manila-centric leagues, most games are held in arenas rented by the league, with games being played in neutral venues. In an innovation dubbed as "NCAA on Tour", starting in 2017, the NCAA will continue holding Thursday games in the first round hosted at the campus of one of the teams that are playing on that day.

Main venues

NCAA on Tour venues

Squads
Each NCAA team can have up to 15 players on their roster. At least two is allowed to be a foreigner, but only one is allowed to be on court. A team is allowed to have three additional players in the reserve list. The opening day rosters were released on July 2.

This is the final season where non-Filipinos are allowed to play.

Imports 
Only four foreigners from three teams participated in the final season imports can play.

Seniors' tournament

Elimination round 
At the end of the elimination round, three-time defending champion San Beda finished first with an undefeated season, winning all 18 games. In their final elimination round game, they defeated Lyceum, the last team to win all 18 elimination round games, in 2017. This allowed the Red Lions to advance to the Finals outright, while modifying the usual Final Four format to a stepladder one. The Red Lions, who last finished the elimination round undefeated in 2010, advanced to their 14th consecutive Finals appearance. The Pirates finished second, awaiting the winning of the first round of stepladder semifinals.

The final participant of the Final Four was determined the following day. With Letran already guaranteed the third seed, only the fourth seed was up for grabs. The San Sebastian Stags defeated the Perpetual Altas to eliminate the Mapua Cardinals to qualify. With elimination confirmed, the Cardinals lost the next game against the Benilde Blazers. The last game of the eliminations had season host Arellano losing to JRU.

Team standings

Match-up results

Scores
Results on top and to the right of the dashes are for first-round games; those to the bottom and to the left of it are second-round games.

Bracket

Stepladder semifinals

First round
This is a one-game playoff. Letran is in its second consecutive playoffs appearance; San Sebastian is in its first appearance since 2017.
Letran was leading 69–52 when San Sebastian cut down the lead to six. Bonbon Batiller scored on two three-pointers to increase Letran's lead to 14, 77–63. RK Ilagan led the Stags to a final run late in the game, reducing the deficit to one point, 81–80 with less than two minutes left. Letran's defense prevented another scoring opportunity for the Stags though, and the Knights held on the win.

Second round
This is a one-game playoff. This is Lyceum's third consecutive playoffs appearance.
Lyceum was leading 70–69 when Letran went on a 15–2 run capped with a Jerrick Balanza three pointer midway in the fourth quarter to give them the lead 84–72. Lyceum cut the lead to three, 87–90, but the Knights converted their free-throws to put the game away for good. Balanza, Fran Yu and Larry Muyang scored on that  crucial fourth quarter run to clinch the Knights' first Finals appearance since 2015.

Finals
This is a best-of-three playoff. This is a rematch of the 2015 Finals which Letran won; this was also their last Finals appearance, and San Beda's last Finals defeat. For three-time defending champion San Beda, this is their 14th consecutive Finals appearance. This is the latest installment of the San Beda–Letran rivalry.

 Finals Most Valuable Player: 
 Coach of the Year: 
In Game 1, San Beda posted manageable leads early in the game, with the halftime score at 32–28. Letran edged out San Beda in a low-scoring third quarter, 39–38. By the middle of the fourth quarter, the Red Lions were leading 58–56 when Fran Yu and Jerrick Balanza each scored a three-pointer, with Larry Muyang converting his free-throws to give Letran the lead 63–60 late in the fourth quarter. Cameroonian Donald Tankoua made a field-goal later on, cutting the lead to one, but Muyang converted a basket to pad the lead to three once again. Evan Nelle made a shot on the next play, bringing back the lead to one in favor of Letran. The Red Lions forced a turnover when Letran ran out the shot-clock with 12 seconds left. Calvin Oftana missed a three-pointer for San Beda that could've given them the lead; Fran Yu rebounded the ball, was fouled, and missed both free-throws, but San Beda failed to grab the rebound as time expired.

San Beda started Game 2 with a 15–0 run; Letran recovered at halftime, cutting San Beda's lead to 12 at 37–25. Letran first took the lead with a Muyang a free-throw of a foul to put the Knights up 44–41. Letran ended the third quarter on an 8–2 run, with Fran Yu converting two three-pointers, to put them up 56–53. In the middle of the fourth period, James Canlas tied the score at 66–all. His San Beda teammate Calvin Oftana ended a 6–0 run to give San Beda a 72–66 lead. Letran then went on an 8–0 run, giving them a 2-point lead late in the fourth period. Oftana converted on a three-point play to give the Red Lions back the lead. On the next play, Bonbon Batiller missed on a close shot with 5.1 seconds left. James Canlas scored on free-throws on the next play to tie the series 1–1.

Letran started by trailing in the final game of the season, with San Beda taking a 19–12 lead, but ended the first quarter on a 14–5 run to take a 26–24 lead. The Red Lions then posted a 9–0 run themselves to tie the game 37–all, but Letran went on a 7–1 run to lead 44–38 at halftime. Letran then had a 7–0 run in the third to post their largest lead of 13. San Beda had their own 14–2 run to cut the deficit 70–71 at the start of the fourth quarter. Letran was leading 81–79 with 11.5 seconds after Evan Nelle scored on 2 consecutive three-pointers. On the next possession, Calvin Oftana forced a jump ball against Fran Yu; the Red Lions won the jump with 5.4 seconds left. Nelle attempted a championship-winning three-pointer, but was blocked, to give Letran their first championship since 2015. Fran Yu, who finished the game with eight points, five rebounds, seven assists and three steals, was named Finals MVP.

Awards 

The awards were given prior to Game 2 of the seniors' Finals. 
Most Valuable Player: 
Rookie of the Year: 
Mythical Five:
 
 
 
 
 
Defensive Player of the Year: 
All-Defensive Team:

Most Improved Player: 
Best Foreign Player: 
Best Defensive Foreign Player:

Player of the Week 
The NCAA Press Corps awards a player of the week sponsored by Chooks-to-Go.

Juniors' tournament

Elimination round

Team standings

Match-up results

Scores
Results on top and to the right of the dashes are for first round games; those to the bottom and to the left of it are second round games.

Fourth-seed playoff
This is a one-game playoff.
LSGH qualified to the Final Four with a 14-win point win against the Arellano Braves. They will face the San Beda Red Cubs, whose only defeat came from the Greenies.

Bracket

Semifinals
San Beda and Lyceum have the twice-to-beat advantage.

San Beda vs. LSGH
San Beda had three players with double-doubles in their semifinal win against LSGH. Yukien Andrada tied a game-high 23 points, with 13 coming in the fourth quarter to lead the Red Cubs.

Lyceum vs. San Sebastian

The Staglets forced a rubber match against the Junior Pirates, with four players finishing in double figures. In the deciding Game 2, John Borba led the Junior Pirates to their first ever NCAA Finals appearance, with 36 points in 15/19 field-goal percentage.

Finals
This is a best-of-three playoff. This is the first NCAA basketball finals where both teams are based outside Metro Manila, with the Red Cubs based in Taytay. Rizal, and the Junior Pirates are based in General Trias, Cavite

 Finals Most Valuable Player: 
The San Beda Red Cubs won their 23rd NCAA title after defeating the Lyceum Junior Pirates in Game 3 of the Finals. San Beda's Rhayyan Amsali was named Finals MVP, and Manu Inigo won his first title on his rookie season.

Awards

 Most Valuable Player: 
 Rookie of the Year: 
 Mythical Five:
 
 
 
 
 
 Defensive Player of the Year: 
 All-Defensive Team:
 
 
 
 
 
 Most Improved Player:

See also 
 UAAP Season 82 basketball tournaments

References

External links
Official website

95
2019–20 in Philippine college basketball